Inga Likšaitė  (born 26 June 1972 in Kaunas) is a Lithuanian artist who often works with embroidery techniques.

See also
List of Lithuanian artists

References
This article was initially translated from the Lithuanian Wikipedia.

External links
Likšaitė's Official Site

Lithuanian artists
1972 births
Living people
Artists from Kaunas
Embroiderers